Raindance is the seventh studio album by Australian country music singer Sara Storer. It was released on 12 April 2019.

Speaking of the first single "Raindance", released in January 2019, Storer said: "'Raindance' is a song of hope. It also sends a message of coming together through dance and song. Music is great therapy and while our nation waits on rain let's dance and sing this drought away. As a songwriter, we can often find ourselves writing stories with a heavy heart whether it be about ourselves or of others. So with regard to the drought, and the endless hardships of Aussie farmers, I felt it time to write a song of hope. A song that can lift out spirits during the nations wait for rain."

The album will be supported by an Australian tour commencing on 2 March and concluding on 18 May.

At the ARIA Music Awards of 2019, the album was nominated for ARIA Award for Best Country Album.

Track listing
 "Raindance" – 3:44
 "My Little Men" – 4:13
 "Plough'n It In" – 2:57
 "Next Year People" (featuring Colin Hay) – 4:23
 "Hayrunner" – 4:45
 "Every Boy Needs a Bike" – 3:37
 "How Sweet the Voice" – 3:49
 "Natalie" – 3:45
 "Fox" – 2:40
 "The Captain" – 3:16
 "Someday" – 3:21
 "Jigalong Girls" – 3:50

Charts

Release history

References

2019 albums
Sara Storer albums
Universal Music Australia albums